Obereopsis variipes is a species of beetle in the family Cerambycidae. It was described by Chevrolat in 1858. It has a wide distribution in Africa.

Subspecies
 Obereopsis variipes variipes Chevrolat, 1858
 Obereopsis variipes snizeki Téocchi, 1999

References

variipes
Beetles described in 1858